Two by Two, two by two, 2×2 or 2by2 may refer to:

Arts, entertainment and media

Film and television
 2×2 (TV channel), a TV channel in Russia
 Two by Two, or Ooops! Noah Is Gone..., a 2015 animated film
 "Two By Two", a Rugrats TV episode

Music and musicals
 Two by Two (musical), a 1970 Broadway show with music by Richard Rodgers

Albums 
 Two by Two (album), by Blue Zoo, 1983 
 2×2, a box set of the albums All or Nothing and The U.S.-Remix Album: All or Nothing by Milli Vanilli released in the UK and France in 1989
 2 X 2, a 1997 album by Gigi
 II x II, a 1970 album by The Cowsills

Songs
 "Two by Two", from the musical The Book of Mormon
 "Two By Two", a song by Quasi from the 1999 album Field Studies
 "2 X 2", a song by Bob Dylan from the 1990 album Under the Red Sky
 Two by Two, a 1988 song by Cristiana Cucchi

Other uses
 2x2, a two-wheeled two-wheel drive vehicle
 2by2, an American lottery game 
 2x2 Project, a public health journalism initiative
 Two-by-two matrix, a square matrix of order 2

See also
 Two (disambiguation)
 2+2 (disambiguation)
 Two two (disambiguation)
 Pocket Cube, a puzzle device also known as a 2×2×2 Rubik's Cube
 Two by Twos, a religious movement